On 10 December 2019, a large group of fighters belonging to the Islamic State in the Greater Sahara attacked a military post in Inates, Tillabéri Region, Niger. They used guns, bombs, and mortars killing over seventy soldiers and kidnapping others in one of the worst attacks in the history of Niger.

Background
In the preceding months, attacks by the Islamic State in Mali, Burkina Faso and Niger have worsened with large scale firearm assaults on both the civilian population and armed forces. In November, gunmen killed over 50 soldiers in the 2019 Indelimane attack in the Ménaka Region of Mali. A week later in Burkina Faso, gunmen stormed a convoy of buses for the Boungou miners, killing 37, although some estimate the death toll to be much higher. This attack happened after an attack on another Niger post which resulted in the killing of three Nigerian soldiers and 14 of the assailants.

Attack
A large group of gunmen stormed the base firing mortars and shooting as many soldiers as possible. The attackers included suicide bombers. The spokesman for the ministry stated that many of the attackers were neutralized by friendly forces. The attack killed 71 soldiers and injured 12 others. 30 more soldiers remained missing after the attack. Following this attack, the president, Mahamadou Issoufou, decided to cancel his trip to Egypt.

Aftermath 
On 12 December, Boko Haram claimed responsibility for the attack through its local branch.

References

2019 in Niger
2019 mass shootings in Africa
21st-century mass murder in Africa
Attacks on military installations in the 2010s
Battles in 2019
December 2019 crimes in Africa
ISIL terrorist incidents in Africa
Islamic terrorist incidents in 2019
Mass murder in Niger
Massacres in 2019
Massacres in Africa
Suicide bombings in 2019
Suicide bombings in Africa
Terrorist incidents in Niger
Tillabéri Region
Mass murder in 2019